William Low (popularly referred to as Willie Low's; latterly marketed as Wm Low) was a chain of supermarkets based in Dundee, Scotland, until it was bought out by Tesco for £257M in 1994.

As a group it was smaller than most of its competitors and often served small towns, although it still had several large supermarkets, including two in Dundee, and two in Perth. Most towns in the Tayside region had at least one large William Low store and it had branches throughout Scotland, North East England, Cumbria and Yorkshire. Tesco had to compete with a rival takeover bid from competitor J Sainsbury for the chain and, following the takeover, 57 of the William Low stores were converted to the Tesco fascia. Prior to this, there were only around 17 Tesco branches in Scotland.

At one stage, the company also ran a chain of frozen food stores known as Lowfreeze. Lowfreeze was sold in 1987 to Bejam, with Bejam being sold to rival Iceland in 1989.

History

Early years
The company was founded by William Rettie and James Low in 1868 The name consists of both the founder's names, one's first name and the other's surname. James's brother, William, joined the shop in 1870, taking over the business some years later.

William Rettie's grandson, Philip, joined the company in 1948, becoming managing director in 1958 and chairman in 1980.

1976–1984 expansion

Wm Low almost doubled in size between 1976 and 1984 with sustained expansion and increased store sizes. Wm Low also rose to be included as number 400 in the Times 1000, a list of top UK Companies in 1984, whereas in 1976 it was not even listed.

Takeovers and mergers
In 1984, Wm Low attempted but failed to take over Hintons, which later became part of Safeway. In 1985, Wm Low took over Laws Stores at a cost of £7.1 million. Laws had a group predominantly based in the north-east of England with a portfolio of smaller stores than Wm Low. Wm Low closed unprofitable Laws stores in 1986.

In 1989, Wm Low attempted to take over Budgens, a move described by Budgens as a friendly merger and which had looked to be a done deal. This deal ultimately collapsed.

Also in 1989, James Millar of Wm Low approached John Apthorp, owner of Bejam Freezer Centres to explore the possibility of merging the two brands. John Apthorp explains that he could not see the idea going ahead as Wm Low were losing market share and the store portfolio did not lend itself well to the possibility of conversions to freezer centre formats. In 1987, Wm Low had sold its frozen food chain, Lowfreeze, to Bejam for £3.8 million.

1993–1994 expansion

Expansion into the north and midlands of England was a priority, with the £12 million,  Loughborough store opening in 1993. Amid huge publicity for price cuts on over 500 items, customers took their sleeping bags to await the opening of the store and claim their hamper, champagne and flowers. This was the company's foray into direct competition with Sainsbury.

Market share

Wm Low was one of the market leaders in Scotland in terms of market share, which was 7.4% in 1981, rising to 10.4% in 1984 and then 12.7% in 1986. It then started to fall until the 1994 takeover by Tesco.

History of the takeover

Competing bids
The takeover battle for William Low started on 14 July 1994, when Tesco announced its formal bid of £156 million for the company to dramatically improve its Scottish portfolio and an assurance it would not cherry pick the best stores. J Sainsbury launched a counter-bid of £210 million but this would have led to a break up of the Wm Low portfolio as they had intended to maintain the best stores and dispose of the rest.

The Scottish market leader at the time, The Argyll Group -  Safeway - announced in July 1994 that it would not be making a bid for Wm Low. Sainsbury was keen to gain a stronger foothold in Scotland, having only 3 stores in Scotland at the time of the bid. Tesco reacted with an improved offer of £247 million and Sainsbury's withdrew from the battle.

Tesco formally took over Wm Low on 2 September 1994 for a total sum of £257 million. Analysis at the time suggested that the Sainsbury bid was possibly a spoiler tactic as opposed to a serious takeover attempt.

The company had been independent for 126 years, having been founded in 1868. The purchase of Wm Low doubled Tesco's Scottish market share from 7.6% to 15.3% in 1995.

Financial performance: before and after
Prior to the take over, sales had been falling at a rate of 6%, a figure that Tesco reversed to a growth of 20% by February 1996 and the former Wm Low stores contributed £11 million profit to the Tesco group.

Tesco quotes pre-tax profits prior to the takeover as being £17m in 1993 and £15m in 1994. The Scottish Business Insider quotes similar yearly figures:

1991: £354 million turnover, £21 million profit
1992: £394 million turnover, £23 million profit
1993: £253 million turnover, £20 million profit
1994: £446 million turnover, £21 million profit

Staff numbers prior to the takeover had been reasonably static, from 8799 employees in 1991 to 8981 in 1994.

Conversion to Tesco-formatted stores
A re-fit programme followed and Tesco scanning tills were installed at every store by August 1995, with the refit being completed by the end of 1996 at a cost of £35 million.

Although the vast majority of old Wm Low stores had been replaced with all-new Tesco stores,  some branches retained some Wm Low format fixtures (e.g. open grid false ceilings and blue / pink tiling in toilets). This is evident in stores such as Inverness Metro, Campbeltown, Fort Willam, Helensburgh, St Andrews, Dalgety Bay, Rosyth, Monifeith, Kilmarnock and Haddington.  This is despite the stores having undergone a couple of internal refits since the takeover.  Tesco Banff was the last obvious Wm Low style store left in the portfolio, having not undergone any refit since immediately after the takeover in 1996. This store was due to be replaced by a new purpose built store in 2010, but in 2014 Tesco scrapped plans to replace the Banff store along with other projects due to a huge loss in profits. Dundee Lochee which was the last large Wm Low superstore closed on 7 February 2009, being replaced by Dundee South Rd, which is spread out over 3 floors. Wishaw Tesco moved to a purpose built store in November 2007 across from its original Wm Low store.

Remaining stores

Most of the remaining Wm Low stores were converted to the Tesco "Metro" format, in line with their smaller size. Such stores can be found in Grangemouth, St Andrews, Campbeltown, Monifieth, Inverness, Fort William, Helensburgh and Stranraer store (is no longer a Tesco Metro). Tesco scrapped the Metro format in 2021, with such stores converted and rebranded under the "Express" or "Superstore" format.

Planned Wm Low store expansion

At the time of the Tesco take over, a number of new Wm Low Stores were earmarked for development. These were ultimately launched as Tescos but had been planned by Wm Low. This included Aviemore, Cupar, Falkirk and Dunblane, opened between 1995 and 1996.

Distribution centres

The Wm Low warehouse in Gateshead was closed in March 1995. The head office and Distribution Centre at the Dryburgh Estate in Dundee became the Tesco Customer Service Centre and one of two Scottish Distribution Depots for Tesco.

Wm Low Dryburgh Distribution Centre was built in the mid 1970s by Wm Low with an expected 25 years life span. In 2006, Tesco announced the closure of the Dundee depot to create a brand new centre in Livingston on the site of the former NEC factory, which would also replace the current distribution centre already based in Livingston (now open as of October 2007). The adjacent customer service centre was unaffected by the closure. The warehouse at Dundee was demolished in 2019.

Store portfolio

The following is a list of Wm Low stores in existence immediately prior to the takeover by Tesco.

Scotland

Banff, Bathgate, Blairgowrie, Bo'ness, Campbeltown, Carnoustie, Coatbridge, Craigmarloch, Crieff, Cumbernauld, Dalgety Bay, Dalkeith, Dingwall, Dumfries, Dunbar, Dundee (two), Dunfermline, Edinburgh (two), Elgin, Forfar, Forres, Fort William, Galloway, Govan (Paisley Road West), Grangemouth, Greenock, Haddington, Helensburgh, Inverness, Inverurie, Keith, Kilmarnock, Kirkcaldy, Kirkintilloch, Kirriemuir, Lanark, Linlithgow, Milngavie, Monifieth, Montrose, Oban, Perth (two: one on Victoria Street in the city centre and one on the Crieff Road; the original store was on South Street), Rosyth, St Andrews, Stranraer, and Wishaw.

In 1999, Tesco agreed to swap the Carnoustie, Dunbar and Kirriemuir stores with Lothian Borders & Angus Co-operative Society to gain a larger superstore in Galashiels.

England
Consett, Driffield, Gateshead (Rowlands Gill), Goole, Ilkeston, Jesmond, Loughborough, Northallerton, Sleaford, Thirsk, Whitehaven, Workington.

Typhoid outbreak 

On 6 and 7 May 1964, the Aberdeen branch delicatessen used a tin of Argentinian corned beef that had not been processed properly (and was infected with typhoid). Due to the fact that the meat was sliced using a communal deli slicer, approximately 500 people were diagnosed in Aberdeen in 1964 with suspected typhoid. William Low was never successful in the city again with their branch closing in the city three years later.

References and footnotes

External links
 An early Wm Low shop at the head of the West Bow, Edinburgh
 History Scotland article by Lesley Diack and David Smith; discusses the Aberdeen Typhoid Outbreak of 1964, more about the case and William Low's involvement

Defunct supermarkets of the United Kingdom
Tesco
Defunct retail companies of the United Kingdom
History of Dundee
Retail companies established in 1868
Retail companies disestablished in 1994
Scottish brands
Companies based in Dundee
1868 establishments in Scotland
1994 disestablishments in Scotland
Defunct companies of Scotland
Retail companies of Scotland